Nationality words link to articles with information on the nation's poetry or literature (for instance, Irish or France).

Events
March 4 — Ronald Reagan, President of the United States, publicly recites from memory lines from Robert W. Service's The Cremation of Sam McGee (1907)
December 18 — Pforzheimer Collection of the works of Percy Bysshe Shelley and his circle donated to the New York Public Library
John Montague becomes the first occupant of the Ireland Chair of Poetry
Dissident Russian poet Dmitri Prigov is arrested by the K.G.B for distributing his samizdat poetry and briefly confined in a psychiatric hospital before being freed after protests by other poets such as Bella Akhmadulina
New American Writing, an annual literary magazine concentrating on poetry, is founded in Chicago
English poet Wendy Cope's Making Cocoa for Kingsley Amis is a best-seller

Works published in English
Listed by nation where the work was first published and again by the poet's native land, if different; substantially revised works listed separately:

Canada
 Don Domanski, Hammerstroke Canada
 Louis Dudek, Zembla's Rocks. Montreal: Véhicule Press, 1986.
 Archibald Lampman, The Story of an Affinity, D.M.R. Bentley ed. (London, ON: Canadian Poetry Press). 
 Irving Layton, Dance With Desire: Love Poems. Toronto:McClelland & Stewart.
 Dennis Lee, editor, The New Canadian Poets (anthology)
 Dorothy Livesay, The Self-Completing Tree: Selected Poems. Victoria: Porcepic.
 Gwendolyn MacEwen, The Man with Three Violins.  HMS Press (Toronto) 
Anne Marriott, Letters from Some Island: New Poems, Oakville, ON: Mosaic Press.
 Michael Ondaatje:
 All along the Mazinaw: Two Poems (broadside), Canadian published in the United States; Milwaukie: Woodland Pattern
Two Poems, Woodland Pattern, Milwaukie
 Raymond Souster, It Takes All Kinds. Ottawa: Oberon Press,
 Wilfred Watson, Collected Poems (introduction by Thomas Peacocke)

India, in English
 Jayanta Mahapatra, Dispossessed Nests ( Poetry in English ), Jaipur: Nirala Publications
 Vikram Seth, The Golden Gate: A Novel in Verse
 Suniti Namjoshi, Flesh and Paper, (with Gillian Hanscombe), Jezebel Tapes and Books, Devon,  and Ragweed,  
 V. K. Gokak, editor, The Golden Treasury of Indo-Anglian Poetry, New Delhi: Sahitya Academy; anthology
 Niranjan Mohanty, editor, The Golden Voices: Poets from Orissa Writing in English, Berhampur University: Poetry Publications; anthology

Ireland
 Eavan Boland, The Journey, and Other Poems, Irish poet published in the United Kingdom
 Dermot Bolger, Internal Exiles
 Seamus Heaney, Clearances, Cornamona Press, Northern Irish  native at this time living in the United States
Alan Moore (poet) Opia, Anvil Press Poetry, Irish poet published in the United Kingdom
 Paul Muldoon, Selected Poems 1968–1983, including "Lunch with Pancho Villa", "Cuba", "Anseo", "Gathering Mushrooms", "The More a Man Has the More a Man Wants", Faber and Faber, Irish poet published in the United Kingdom
 Eiléan Ní Chuilleanáin: The Second Voyage, Dublin: The Gallery Press
 Frank Ormsby, A Northern Spring, including "Home", Oldcastle: The Gallery Press
 James Simmons, Poems 1956–1986, including "One of the Boys", "West Strand Visions" and "From the Irish", Oldcastle: The Gallery Press

New Zealand
 Fleur Adcock (New Zealand poet who moved to England in 1963):
 Hotspur: a ballad, Newcastle upon Tyne: Bloodaxe Books (New Zealand poet who moved to England in 1963)
 The Incident Book, Oxford and New York: Oxford University Press
 Alan Brunton, New Order, New York:Red Mole, work by a New Zealand poet in the United States
 Allen Curnow, The Loop in Lone Kauri Road: Poems 1983–1985
 Lauris Edmond, Seasons and Creatures
 Cilla McQueen, Wild Sweets
 Les Murray, editor, Anthology of Australian Religious Poetry, Melbourne, Collins Dove (new edition, 1991)
 Norman Simms, Silence and Invisibility: A Study of the New Literature from the Pacific, Australia, and New Zealand, scholarship

United Kingdom
 Dannie Abse, Ask the Bloody Horse
 Fleur Adcock (New Zealand poet who moved to England in 1963):
 The Incident Book, Oxford and New York: Oxford University Press
 Selected Poems, Oxford and New York : Oxford University Press
 Eavan Boland, The Journey, and Other Poems, Irish poet published in the United Kingdom
 Charles Causley, Early in the Morning
 Jack Clemo, A Different Drummer
 Tony Connor, Spirits of Place
 Wendy Cope, Making Cocoa for Kingsley Amis
 Kevin Crossley-Holland, Waterslain
 Carol Ann Duffy, Thrown Voices
 Helen Dunmore, The Sea Skater
 Elaine Feinstein, Badlands, Hutchinson
 Roy Fuller, Outside the Canon
 Seamus Heaney: Clearances, Cornamona Press, Northern Ireland native at this time living in the United States
 Adrian Henri, Collected Poems
 Ted Hughes, Flowers and Insects
 George MacBeth, The Cleaver Garden
 Edwin Morgan, From the Video Box
 Grace Nichols, Whole of a Morning Sky
 Fiona Pitt-Kethley, Sky Ray Lolly
 Peter Reading, Stet
 E. J. Scovell, Listening to Collared Doves
 Penelope Shuttle, The Lion From Rio
 Jon Silkin, The Ship's Pasture
 John Stallworthy, The Anzac Sonata
 R.S. Thomas, Experimenting with an Amen
 Abdullah al-Udhari, editor and translator, Modern  Poetry of the Arab World, Penguin, anthology

United States
 A.R. Ammons, The Selected Poems: Expanded Edition
 Ralph Angel, Anxious Latitudes
 Gwendolyn Brooks, The Near-Johannesburg Boy and Other Poems
 Alan Brunton, New Order, New York:Red Mole, work by a New Zealand poet in the United States
 Raymond Carver, Ultramarine
 Henri Cole, The Marble Queen
 Lawrence Ferlinghetti, Over All the Obscene Boundaries
 Alice Fulton, Palladium
 Marilyn Hacker, Love, Death and the Changing of the Seasons
 Seamus Heaney: Clearances, Cornamona Press, Northern Ireland native at this time living in the United States
 John Hollander, In Time and Place
 Paul Hoover, Nervous Songs, (L'Epervier Press)
 Jane Kenyon, The Boat of Quiet Hours
 Li-Young Lee, Rose
 Mary Oliver, Dream Work
 Michael Ondaatje:
 All along the Mazinaw: Two Poems (broadside), Canadian published in the United States; Milwaukie: Woodland Pattern
Two Poems, Woodland Pattern, Milwaukie
 Carl Rakosi, Collected Poems published by the National Poetry Foundation
 Vikram Seth, The Golden Gate: A Novel in Verse
 Rosmarie Waldrop, Streets Enough to Welcome Snow (Station Hill)

Anthologies in the United States
 Philip Dacey and David Jauss, editors of the New Formalist anthology, Strong Measures: Contemporary American Poetry in Traditional Forms
 Ron Silliman, editor, In the American Tree, anthology of Language poets

Other in English
 Paula Burnett, Penguin Book of Caribbean Verse, anthology
 Derek Walcott, Collected Poems, St. Lucia native living in the United States

Works published in other languages

Danish
 Jørgen Gustava Brandt, Giv dagen dit lys ("Give the Day Your Light")
 Niels Frank, Digte i kim, Denmark
 Christian Graugaard, Kan jeg købe dine øjnes blå dans ("Can I Buy Your Eyes Blue Dance")

French language
 Kama Sywor Kamanda, Chants de brumes, Congo native writing in French
 Abdellatif Laabi, L'Écorché vif. L'Harmattan, Paris, Moroccan author writing in and published in France
 Jean Royer, Le chemin brûlé, Montréal: l'Hexagone; Canada
 Marie Uguay, Poèmes (contains Signe et rumeur, L'Outre-vie, and Autoportraits)  French-Canada (posthumously published)

India
Listed in alphabetical order by first name:
 Nirendranath Chakravarti, Jabotiyo Bhalobashabashi, Kolkata: Proma Prokashoni; Bengali-language
 Rajendra Bhandari, Yee shabdaharu: yee harafharu ("These Words: These Lines"), Gangtok, Sikkim: Jana Paksha Prakashan; Nepali-language
 Sitanshu Yashaschandra, Jatayu, Mumbai and Ahmedabad: R R Sheth & Co.; Gujarati-language
 Namdeo Dhasal, Gandu Bagicha Marathi-language
 Varavara Rao (better known as "VV"), Bhavishyathu Chitrapatam or Bhavishyattu Chitrapatam ("Portrait of the Future"), Vijayawada: Vijayakrishna Printers; Telugu-language
 Mehr Lal Soni Zia Fatehabadi, Naram garam hawain (The soft Warm Air) - published posthumously by R.K.Sehgal, Bazm-e-Seemab, J 5/21, Rajouri Garden, New Delhi.

Poland
 Stanisław Barańczak, Atlantyda i inne wiersze z lat 1981-85 ("Atlantis and Other Poems"), London: Puls
 Juliusz Erazm Bolek, Nago
 Ernest Bryll, Adwent ("Advent"), London
 Ewa Lipska, Utwory wybrane ("Selected Work"), Kraków: Wydawnictwo literackie
 Bronisław Maj:
 Album rodzinny ("Family Album"); Cracow: Oficyna Literacka
 Zaglada świętego miasta ("Destruction of the Holy City"); London: Puls
 Zmęczenie ("Fatigue"); Cracow: Znak
 Piotr Sommer, Czynnik liryczny
 Jan Twardowski, Nie przyszedłem pana nawracać. Wiersze z lat 1937- 1985 ("I Did Not Come to Convert You: Poems From the Years 1937-1985"), Warsaw: Wydawnictwo Archidiecezji Warszawskiej

Other languages
 Mario Benedetti, Preguntas al azar ("Random Questions"), Uruguay
 Christoph Buchwald, general editor, and Elke Erb, guest editor, Luchterhand Jahrbuch der Lyrik 1986 ("Luchterhand Poetry Yearbook 1986"), publisher: Luchterhand Literaturverlag; anthology
 Matilde Camus, Sin teclado de fiebre ("Without a fever keyboard"), Spain
 Osman Durrani, editor, German Poetry of the Romantic Era (with poetry in German), anthology, Leamington Spa, England: Oswald, Wolf and Berg (publisher)
 Nizar Qabbani, Poems Inciting Anger, Syrian poet writing in Arabic
 Maria Luisa Spaziani, La stella del libero arbitrio, Italy
 Wisława Szymborska: Ludzie na moście ("People on the Bridge"), Poland
 Andrei Voznesensky, The Ditch: A Spiritual Trial, prose and poetry primarily about a 1941 German massacre of 12,000 Russians in the Crimea and the looting of their mass graves in the 1980s by Soviet citizens. Addressing a topic long suppressed by the Soviet government, the work made clear that most of the victims were Jews, and it implied this was why Soviet authorities tolerated the grave robbing. Russian-language work published in the Soviet Union.
 Wang Xiaoni, Wode shixuan ("My Selected Poems"), China

Awards and honors

Australia
 C. J. Dennis Prize for Poetry: Rhyll McMaster, Washing the Money and John A. Scott, St. Clair
 Kenneth Slessor Prize for Poetry: Robert Gray Selected Poems 1963-83
 Mary Gilmore Prize: Stephen Williams - A Crowd of Voices

Canada
 Gerald Lampert Award: Joan Fern Shaw, Raspberry Vinegar
 Archibald Lampman Award: Colin Morton, This Won't Last Forever
 1986 Governor General's Awards: Al Purdy, The Collected Poems of Al Purdy (English); Cécile Cloutier, L'écouté (French)
 Pat Lowther Award: Erín Moure, Domestic Fuel
 Dorothy Livesay Poetry Prize: Joe Rosenblatt, Poetry Hotel
 Prix Émile-Nelligan: Carole David, Terroristes d'amour and France Mongeau, Lumières

United Kingdom
 Cholmondeley Award: Lawrence Durrell, James Fenton, Selima Hill
 Eric Gregory Award: Mick North, Lachlan Mackinnon, Oliver Reynolds, Stephen Romer
 Queen's Gold Medal for Poetry: Norman MacCaig

United States
 Agnes Lynch Starrett Poetry Prize: Robley Wilson, Kingdoms of the Ordinary
 AML Award for poetry to Dennis Marden Clark for "Sunwatch"
 Bernard F. Connors Prize for Poetry: John Koethe, "Mistral"
 Frost Medal: Allen Ginsberg / Richard Eberhart
 Poet Laureate Consultant in Poetry to the Library of Congress appointed: Robert Penn Warren
 Pulitzer Prize for Poetry: Henry Taylor, The Flying Change
 Ruth Lilly Poetry Prize: Adrienne Rich
 Whiting Awards: John Ash, Hayden Carruth, Frank Stewart, Ruth Stone
 Fellowship of the Academy of American Poets: Irving Feldman and Howard Moss

Births
 Raymond Antrobus, English poet and educator
 Caroline Bird, English poet
 Fateme Ekhtesari, Persian poet and midwife

Deaths
Birth years link to the corresponding "[year] in poetry" article:
 January 4 – Christopher Isherwood (born 1904), English-born American novelist and poet
 January 9 – W. S. Graham (born 1918), Scottish poet
 January 12 – Bob Kaufman, at 60 (born 1925), American Beat poet, of emphysema
 March 4 – Elizabeth Smart, at 72 (born 1913), Canadian poet and novelist
 March 8 – Kersti Merilaas, at 72 (born 1913), Estonian poet, translator and author of children's fiction
 March 30 – John Ciardi, at 69 (born 1916), American poet, translator and etymologist, of a heart attack
 April 15 – Jean Genet, at 75 (born 1910), French novelist, playwright, poet, essayist and political activist
 April 21 – Salah Jahin, also spelled "Salah Jaheen" صلاح جاهين (born 1930), Egyptian, Arabic-language poet, lyricist, playwright and cartoonist
 May 25 – Carlo Betocchi, at 87 (born 1899), Italian poet
 June 24 – Rex Warner (born 1905), English classicist, author, poet and translator
 July 13 – Brion Gysin, at 70 (born 1916), English painter, writer, sound poet and performance artist
 August 19 – Mehr Lal Soni Zia Fatehabadi, at 73 (born 1913), Urdu poet, essayist, critic, biographer
 August 20 – Milton Acorn, at 63 (born 1923), Canadian poet, writer and playwright, of heart disease and diabetes
 August 31 – Elizabeth Coatsworth, at 93 (born 1893), American author of children's fiction and poetry
 November 10 – Laurence Collinson (born 1925), Australian playwright, actor, poet, journalist and secondary school teacher, in London
 December 8 – Henry Reed, at 72 (born 1914), English poet, translator, radio playwright and journalist
 Also:
 Atul Chandra Hazarika (born 1903), Indian, writing in Assamese; poet, dramatist, children's story writer and translator; called "Sahitycharjya" by an Assamese literary society
 Audrey Longbottom (born c. 1922), Australian

See also

 Poetry
 List of years in poetry
 List of poetry awards

References

20th-century poetry
Poetry